Mögglingen (Gmünd) station is a railway stop in the municipality of Mögglingen, located in the Ostalbkreis district in Baden-Württemberg, Germany. The station lies on the Rems Railway. The train services are operated by Go-Ahead Baden-Württemberg.

References 

Railway stations in Baden-Württemberg
Buildings and structures in Ostalbkreis